Arc Exploration Limited (ASX code: ARX) is an Australian publicly listed company focused on gold exploration in Indonesia. It was formed in 1983 and has three major projects currently underway:
Trenggalek
Bima
The project in Bima is resisted by the local population. Human rights violations have been reported and in protests in December 2011 several people were killed by police forces.
Papua

External links
Company Website
Police report two killed in protest over planned gold mine in Indonesia. The China Post, 25.12.2011
2 people killed as protest over planned gold mine in eastern Indonesia turns violent. Global BC, 25.12.2011
8 killed in Indonesian gold mining protest. Indymedia, 25.12.2011

Companies listed on the Australian Securities Exchange
Gold mining companies of Australia
Companies established in 1983
1983 establishments in Australia